Gorginabad may refer to:
 Gorginabad, Behabad